CQD (transmitted in Morse code as ) is one of the first distress signals adopted for radio use. On 7 January 1904 the Marconi International Marine Communication Company issued "Circular 57", which specified that, for the company's installations, beginning 1 February 1904 "the call to be given by ships in distress or in any way requiring assistance shall be 'C Q D' ".

Background
Land telegraphs had adopted the convention of using "CQ" ("", from the French word ) to identify alert, or precautionary messages of interest to all stations along a telegraph line. CQ had then been adopted in maritime radiotelegraphy as a "general call" to any ship or land station.

In landline use there was no general emergency signal, so the Marconi company added a "D" ("distress") to CQ in order to create a distress call. Sending "D" was already used internationally to indicate an urgent message. Thus, "CQD" was understood by wireless operators to mean All stations: Distress. Although used worldwide by Marconi operators, CQD was never adopted as an international standard, since it can easily be mistaken for a mere general call "CQ" when reception is poor.

CQD supplanted by SOS
At the first International Radiotelegraphic Convention, held in Berlin in 1906, Germany's  distress signal of three-dots three-dashes three-dots was adopted as the international Morse code distress signal.

This distress signal soon became known as "SOS" because it has the same dash-dot sequence as the letters S O S with the gaps between the letters removed, and in fact is properly written , with an overbar, to distinguish it from the three individual letters. In contrast, CQD is transmitted as three distinct letters with a short gap between each, like regular text. The SOS distress code is also easier to hear as it is nine symbols long, while no other character or sign is longer than six symbols. Germany had first adopted this distress signal in regulations effective 1 April 1905.

History of wireless distress rescues
From 1899 to 1908, nine documented rescues were made by the use of wireless. The earliest of these was a distress call from the East Goodwin lightship. However, for the earliest of these, there was no standardized distress signal. The first US ship to send a wireless distress call in 1905 simply sent HELP (in both International Morse and American Morse code).

On 7 December 1903, Ludwig Arnson was a wireless operator aboard the liner  when she lost a propeller off the Irish coast.  His call of CQD brought aid from a British cruiser. In 1944 Arnson received the Marconi Memorial Medal of Achievement in recognition of his sending the first wireless distress signal. By February 1904, the Marconi Wireless Company required all its operators to use CQD for a ship in distress or for requiring URGENT assistance.  In the early morning of 23 January 1909, whilst sailing into New York from Liverpool,  collided with the Italian liner SS Florida in fog off the Massachusetts island of Nantucket.  Radio Operator Jack Binns sent the CQD distress signal by wireless transmission.

On 15 April 1912,  radio operator Jack Phillips initially sent "CQD", which was still commonly used by British ships. Harold Bride, the junior radio operator, suggested using , saying half-jokingly that it might be his last chance to use the new code. Phillips thereafter began to alternate between the two.  Although Bride survived, Phillips perished in the sinking.

See also
 500 kHz (Morse distress frequency)
 2182 kHz (voice distress frequency)
 Global Maritime Distress and Safety System
 Mayday
 Prosigns for Morse code

Footnotes

References

Bibliography
 Stephan Dubreuil, Come Quick, Danger: A history of marine radio in Canada, Ottawa: Fisheries and Oceans Canada, Coast Guard, 1998. .
 Pete Caesar, SOS ... CQD: Four Ships in Trouble, Muskegon, Mich.: Marine Press, 1977. .



Telecommunications-related introductions in 1904
Amateur radio history
Emergency communication
History of telecommunications
Morse code
Rescue